Star/Boom Boom is the second studio album by Pakistani pop duo Nazia and Zoheb (Nazia Hassan & Zohaib Hassan), released in 1982. The Bollywood film Star used the album's music as its soundtrack. The album was thus also released as Star, a Bollywood music soundtrack album. The album featured music composed by British-Indian producer Biddu.

The music was a blend of Eastern and Western music, and the album enjoyed the same success as the duo's previous album Disco Deewane (1981). The album was re-released as Boom Boom in 1984, and was later re-released in 2004. The album, along with several other albums from Biddu and the Hassan duo, contributed to the creation of the Indi-pop market.

Production 
According to Biddu, he showed the film's producers various tracks, "including one surefire hit called 'Boom Boom'. To add to the pot, Nazia Hassan and her brother Zoheb were going to sing all the songs for the soundtrack. The record company was thrilled. They sensed a hit album on their hands, as the brother–sister duo was extremely popular with the masses." The album was produced before the film's Hindi screenplay had been written.

The song "Nigahon Say Door" from the film, sung by Nazia and composed by Biddu, was not included in the album.  Whereas "Khushi (Teri Hai Meri Khushi)" was included in the album, but was not featured in the film.

Reception 
India Today gave the album Star a positive review in 1982. They stated, "Now a brand new, smash hit album by the superstars of Disco Deewane!" They added, "If Disco Deewane set your pulse racing, then here's something that will blow your mind" and concluded "Star will make your heart go boom boom! Star will make you feel like ooee ooie! Star is like nothing you've heard before." The title track "Boom Boom" in particular was well received.

Retrospectively, The Herald in 2006 called Boom Boom one of the duo's "great efforts" along with Disco Deewane, compared to later solo Zohaib Hassan albums such as Kismat (2006). In 2010, the Wired and Rolling Stone music critic Geeta Dayal, in a retrospective feature on South Asia's early disco and electronic dance music, described "Boom Boom" as one of the region's "epic synthesizer tracks" of the early 1980s. She noted that it has a resemblance to Donna Summer's "I Feel Love" (1977), but with a "galloping bassline"; she described Nazia Hassan as South Asia's Donna Summer and Biddu as the region's Giorgio Moroder.

Track listing 
 Composition: Biddu
 Lyrics: Indeevar, Amit Khanna

 "Boom Boom" — Nazia Hassan
 "Ooee Ooee" — Zohaib Hassan
 "Jana" — Nazia Hassan & Zohaib Hassan
 "Zindagi" — Zohaib Hassan
 "Muskuraye Ja" — Zohaib Hassan
 "Star" — Zohaib Hassan
 "Khushi" — Nazia Hassan
 "Dheree Dheree" — Zohaib Hassan
 "Koi Nahin" — Nazia Hassan

Remix album 
Biddu produced a remix album of Boom Boom, released in 1995. It topped the Indian charts, selling 150,000 units in less than a month. The title song "Boom Boom" was accompanied by a new music video.

References 

1982 albums
Urdu-language albums
Nazia and Zoheb albums
Disco albums
Nazia Hassan albums